Mitsubishi Motors (Thailand) is the Thai operation of Mitsubishi Motors Corporation. It became the first Thai automobile manufacturer to export vehicles overseas in 1988, and has remained the country's largest exporter every year since.

Mitsubishi Motors Thailand is currently the most productive of the parent corporation's four manufacturing facilities outside Japan, with 133,109 vehicles produced in 2006. It exported its one millionth pickup truck in October 2007. In anticipation of a growth in the market for pickup trucks, Mitsubishi is investing 21 billion baht (¥1 billion) to increase local capacity to 200,000 units. In November 2015, Mitsubishi Motors Thailand celebrated production of its four millionth vehicle.

Mitsubishi Motors Thailand owns a subsidiary, MMTh Engine, located at Laem Chabang Industrial Estates, Tambon Thung Sukhla, Si Racha District, Chonburi Province, which produces auto components.

History
Mitsubishi has had a presence in Thailand since 1961. Mitsubishi began building trucks in Thailand in 1966, under a company called United Development Motor Industry Co (UDMI) (established 1964). In 1965, Mitsubishi Heavy Industries (MHI) became the majority shareholder (60%) of UDMI.
The Galant sedan followed in 1972 and the L200 pickup truck in 1981. MMC acquired 40% of Sittipol Motor Co (SMC), the distributor of Mitsubishi vehicles in Thailand, in late 1973. In 1987, SMC and UDMI merged to become MMC Sittipol Co., Ltd. (MSC) with MMC holding 48%. In 1988, Mitsubishi Mirage was exported to supply Chrysler Canada. In 1992, local production at the No. 1 factory in Laem Chabang started. In 1996, local production at the Laem Chabang No. 2 Factory was started. In August 1997, MMC became the majority owner of MSC. In 2003, MSC changed its name to Mitsubishi Motors (Thailand) Co., Ltd. In January 2004, the Fuso truck business was split to form Mitsubishi Fuso Trucks (Thailand).

In 2001 Mitsubishi increased their stake from 46.2 to 99.9 percent, followed by a name change to "Mitsubishi Motors (Thailand) Co., Ltd." in November 2003.

Current models
 Mitsubishi Triton (2005–present)
 Mitsubishi Pajero Sport (2008–present)
 Mitsubishi Mirage (2012–present)
 Mitsubishi Attrage (2013–present)
 Dodge Attitude (2013–present, export only)
Mitsubishi Outlander PHEV (2020–present)

Imported 

 Mitsubishi Xpander (2018–present)
Mitsubishi Xpander Cross (2020–present)

Former models

Manufactured locally 
Mitsubishi Space Wagon (2003–2011)
Mitsubishi Lancer (2000–2014)
Fiat Fullback / RAM 1200 (2016–2019, export only)
Mitsubishi Strada G-Wagon (2001–2005)
Nissan Navara (D40) (2012–2014)

Imported 

 Mitsubishi Delica D:5 (2015–2016; Japan)
 Mitsubishi Outlander (2003–2005; Japan)
 Mitsubishi Pajero (1991–2006; Japan)

Production and sales
The company surpassed a cumulative five million production units by 2018.

Mitsubishi Motors Thailand exported 332,700 vehicles in 2019, a 3.9% drop. Mitsubishi posted local sales in 2019 of 88,244 units, up 4.4%, overcoming a Thai car market that fell 3.3% to 1,007,552 units sold in 2019.

(Sources: Facts & Figures 2000, Facts & Figures 2005, Facts & Figures 2008, Facts & Figures 2010, Facts & Figures 2013, Facts & Figures 2018, Facts & Figures 2019, Mitsubishi Motors website)

References

External links
Official website

Mitsubishi Motors factories
Mitsubishi Motors subsidiaries
Motor vehicle assembly plants in Thailand
Thai companies established in 1987
Manufacturing companies established in 1987